Vichy Catalán is a Spanish brand of carbonated mineral water bottled from its homonymous thermal spring in Caldes de Malavella, Girona. It is the leading carbonated mineral water in Spain, with 40% market share. The brand is owned by Grup Vichy Catalan («Premium Mix Group S.L.») ) by the physician and surgeon Modest Furest i Roca after buying the lands of the water spring in Caldes de Malavella, and discovering the mineral-medicinal properties of its thermal waters.

Composition 
Source Fine Elements

Bibliography 
 
Content in this edit is translated from the existing Catalan Wikipedia article at Grup Vichy Catalan; see its history for attribution.

References

External links 
 Official site
 La Tienda Vichy
 Manantial de Sant Hilari

Mineral water
Spanish brands